The Holmenkollen ski festival has taken place on an almost annual basis since 1892. This article presents a list of multiple winners in current and former events.

Current events

Men's 50 km

Debuted 1898

Men's nordic combined
Debuted 1892. Sprint event debuted in 1997. 10 km event since 2010, unless else noted.

Women's 30 km
Debuted 1988

Men's ski jumping
Debuted 1933

Women's ski jumping
Debuted in 2000.

Men's biathlon
Debuted 1984

Women's biathlon
Debuted 1988

Discontinued events

Men's 18 km
Competed 1933–40, 1946–55.

Men's 15 km
Competed 1954–85, 1994.

Women's 5 km
Competed 1966–69, 1972–82, 1991.

Women's 10 km
Competed 1954–83, 1986.

Women's 20 km
Competed 1981–85, 1987.

References
Holmenkollen winners since 1892 - click Vinnere for downloadable pdf file 
Skiforeningen - Official site for Holmenkollen 
Holmenkollen biathlon information

Norway sport-related lists